Brimelow is the surname of:

 Alison Brimelow (born 1949), former Chief Executive and Comptroller General of the United Kingdom Patent Office, and former President of the European Patent Office
 Thomas Brimelow (1915–1995), British diplomat
 Peter Brimelow (born 1947), British-American financial journalist, author, and right-wing political activist